Jennifer Cooper (born 11 June 1961) is a New Zealand book illustrator.

Biography 

Cooper was born and grew up in Wellington. She studied graphic design at Christchurch Polytechnic and her first job after graduation was at Canterbury Museum. In 1998 she began working as a freelance illustrator, drawing for junior fiction and educational books.

Cooper spent three years living in Samoa and was a high school teacher there. Her art style ranges from realistic, photograph-based illustrations to cartoons.

Awards and recognition

References 

1961 births
Living people
New Zealand illustrators
New Zealand women illustrators